Choi Kyung-sun (born 16 March 1992) is a South Korean long-distance runner.

In 2017, she competed in the women's marathon at the 2017 World Championships in Athletics held in London, United Kingdom. The following year, she finished in 4th place in the women's marathon at the 2018 Asian Games held in Jakarta, Indonesia.

References

External links 
 
 

Living people
1992 births
Place of birth missing (living people)
South Korean female long-distance runners
South Korean female marathon runners
World Athletics Championships athletes for South Korea
Athletes (track and field) at the 2018 Asian Games
Asian Games competitors for South Korea
Athletes (track and field) at the 2020 Summer Olympics
Olympic athletes of South Korea
21st-century South Korean women